C'Chartres Football, or simply C'Chartres, is a football club based in Chartres, France. The club was founded in 2018 by the merger of FC Chartres and Chartres Horizon. As of the 2021–22 season, the club plays in Championnat National 2, the fourth level of French football, and its reserve team plays in Championnat National 3.

References

External links
 C'Chartres Official Facebook site 

Association football clubs established in 2018
Football clubs in France
2018 establishments in France
Chartres
Sport in Eure-et-Loir
Football clubs in Centre-Val de Loire